The West Virginia Circuit Courts are the West Virginia state trial courts of general jurisdiction. They are the only state trial courts in West Virginia that are courts of record. West Virginia's 55 counties are divided into 31 circuits, each comprising anywhere from one to four counties. Different circuits have different numbers of judges; 11 circuits have only a single judge.

Circuit judges were formerly elected in partisan elections to serve eight-year terms.  In 2015, the Legislature changed the law to provide that future elections will be on a non-partisan basis.   Judges must have engaged in the practice of law for at least five years. When a vacancy occurs, the governor of West Virginia appoints a judge, who must run in the next election to retain his or her seat.  Because of the nature of the state's judicial retirement system, resignations near the end of a judge's term are common if the judge is a member of the same political party as the sitting governor.

The circuit courts have original jurisdiction over:
 All civil cases with an amount in controversy in excess of $300
 All civil cases in equity
 Writs of habeas corpus, mandamus, quo warranto, prohibition, and certiorari
 All felonies and misdemeanors

The circuit courts have original appellate jurisdiction involving:
 Appeals from magistrate court and municipal court (lower state courts of limited jurisdiction)

Until June 30, 2022, the circuit courts have appellate jurisdiction over:
 Appeals from the decisions of administrative agencies (excluding workers' compensation appeals)
 Appeals of family court decisions, unless both parties agree to appeal directly to the Supreme Court of Appeals of West Virginia

On July 1, 2022 such appeals shall go to the Intermediate Court of Appeals of West Virginia

Appeals from the decisions of circuit courts go the state supreme court, the Supreme Court of Appeals of West Virginia.  Effective July 1, 2022, civil appeals will go to the Intermediate Court, while criminal appeals will continue to go to the Supreme Court

History

Circuit Courts for each county are required by the state constitution, and have existed since the creation of the state.  Prior to 1976, the state legislature often established supplemental limited jurisdiction courts of varying jurisdiction in some counties, including Courts of Common Pleas, Criminal Courts, Intermediate Courts, and Divorce Courts. In 1976, all of these courts were abolished.  The payment and supervision of judges was also transferred from county to state responsibility in that year.

Divorce jurisdiction was handled in a variety of informal ways until 1986 when a "Family Law Master" system was established, making "recommended decisions" to the judge.  This system proved unsatisfactory and was replaced with the West Virginia Family Courts in 2000, and Circuit Court were assigned appellate jurisdiction in such matters.

Prior to the 2000 elections, judges were elected in a form of "jungle" election with a single election for all seats.  For example, in Kanawha County, voters were asked to vote for "not more than seven" and the top seven won election.  This was replaced with numbered divisions in multi-judge circuits, with a separate vote for one election in each division, so judges do not have to run against one another for re-election.

Beginning with the 2016 elections, judges were elected on a non-partisan basis and the election was moved from a primary in May and a general election in November to a single election in May, giving newly elected judges more time to wind up their practices.  The judges elected in the non-partisan election held May 10, 2016 and took office January 1, 2017.

List of judicial circuits

 First – Hancock, Brooke and Ohio counties (four judges)
 Second – Marshall, Wetzel and Tyler counties (two judges)
 Third – Ritchie, Doddridge, and Pleasants counties (one judge)
 Four – Wood and Wirt counties (three judges)
 Fifth – Calhoun, Jackson, Mason and Roane counties (three judges)
 Sixth – Cabell County (four judges)
 Seventh – Logan County (two judges)
 Eighth – McDowell County (two judges)
 Ninth – Mercer County (three judges)
 Tenth – Raleigh County (four judges)
 Eleventh – Greenbrier and Pocahontas counties (two judges)
 Twelfth – Fayette County (two judges)
 Thirteenth – Kanawha County (seven judges)
 Fourteenth – Braxton, Clay, Gilmer, and Webster counties (two judges)
 Fifteenth – Harrison County (three judges)
 Sixteenth – Marion County (two judges)
 Seventeenth – Monongalia County (three judges)
 Eighteenth – Preston County (one judge)
 Nineteenth – Barbour and Taylor counties (two judges)
 Twentieth – Randolph County (one judge)
 Twenty-First – Grant, Mineral and Tucker counties (two judges)
 Twenty-Second – Hampshire, Hardy and Pendleton counties (two judges)
 Twenty-Third – Berkeley, Jefferson and Morgan counties (six judges)
 Twenty-Fourth – Wayne County (two judges)
 Twenty-Fifth – Boone and Lincoln counties (two judges)
 Twenty-Sixth – Lewis and Upshur counties (two judge)
 Twenty-Seventh – Wyoming County (one judge)
 Twenty-Eighth – Nicholas County (one judge)
 Twenty-Ninth – Putnam County (two judges)
 Thirtieth – Mingo County (one judge)
 Thirty-First – Monroe and Summers counties (one judge)

References

Circuit Courts
West Virginia
Courts and tribunals with year of establishment missing